The Rai Open is a professional tennis tournament played on outdoor red clay courts. It is currently part of the Association of Tennis Professionals (ATP) Challenger Tour. It is held annually in Rome, Italy, since 2009.

Past finals

Singles

Doubles

External links
Official Tournament website

 
ATP Challenger Tour
Clay court tennis tournaments
Sports competitions in Rome
Tennis tournaments in Italy